This page details football records in Brazil.

Highest Single-Match Attendances
 Most matches with attendance of more than 100,000, ranked by club.

 Flamengo = 117
 Vasco =  72
 Fluminense =  59
 Botafogo =  43
 Corinthians =  23
 Santos =  20
 Atlético =  19
 São Paulo =  17
 Cruzeiro  =  15
 Palmeiras  =  13

National team

Brasileirão
Records in this section refer to (Level 1) i.e. Taça Brasil from its founding in 1959 through to 1968, the Torneio Roberto Gomes Pedrosa from its founding in 1967 through to 1970, and the Campeonato Brasileiro Série A or Brasileirão from 1971 to the present. Some records relating to team performances are divided into records in the round-robin era (from 2003 to the present) and the championships before it.

Titles
Most Brazilian national titles: 11 
Palmeiras (1960, 1967 (TB), 1967 (R), 1969, 1972, 1973, 1993, 1994, 2016, 2018, 2022)
Most consecutive Brazilian national titles: 5:
Santos (1961, 1962, 1963, 1964, 1965)

Top-flight Appearances
Most appearances: 55
 Grêmio
Most consecutive seasons in top-flight: 51
Cruzeiro
Fewest appearances in top-flight (from 1971): 1, joint record:
Vitória-ES (1977)
Noroeste (1978)
ASA (1979)
Caldense (1979)
Colatina (1979)
Francana (1979)
Guará (1979)
Itumbiara (1979)
Novo Hamburgo (1979)
Operário-PR (1979)
Potiguar (1979)
São Bento (1979)
Internacional de Santa Maria (1982)
Taguatinga (1982)
Ferroviária (1983)
Juventus (1983)
Auto Esporte-PI (1984)
Catuense (1984)
Corumbaense (1985)
Sobradinho (1986)
Brasiliense (2005)
Ipatinga (2008)

Wins
Most wins in the top-flight overall: São Paulo, 683
Most wins in a season:
Most wins in a top-flight season (before 2003): 25, Palmeiras (1973)
Most wins in a top-flight season: 31, Cruzeiro (2003)
Most consecutive wins in the top flight:
Most consecutive wins:
Most consecutive wins from the start of a season:
Most consecutive wins from the start of a season in the top flight:
Most consecutive away wins:
Fewest wins in a season (1967-2003): 0, joint record:
Ferroviário-PR (1967)
Campinense (1975)
Piauí (1979)
Chapecoense (1979)
Guará (1979)
Maranhão (1980)
Desportiva (1981)
Uberaba (1981)
River (1982)
Nacional (1982, 1984)
Atlético-PR (1982)
Galícia (1983)
Fortaleza (1983)
Moto Club (1983)
Catuense (1984)
Brasília (1984)
Remo (1986)
Fewest wins in a season (after 2003): 1, Chapecoense, 2021
100% home win record in a season:

Draws
Most draws overall in the top flight: São Paulo, 459
Most draws in a season:
Most consecutive draws:

Losses
Most losses overall in the top flight: Botafogo, 503
Most losses in a season: América-RN, 29, 2007
Fewest losses: Malutrom, 1

Points
Most points overall in the top flight: 2859, Grêmio
Most points in a season (before 2003):
3 points for a win: 70, Vasco da Gama (1997)
2 points for a win: 62, Palmeiras (1973)
Most points in a season (after 2003):100, Cruzeiro (2003)
Most points in a season for a top-flight team: 100, Cruzeiro (2003)
Fewest points in a season (before 2003): 0, joint record
River (1982)
Brasília (1984)
Fewest points in a season (after 2003): 15, Chapecoense (2021)

Games without a loss
Most consecutive Brasileirão games without a loss:42, Botafogo-RJ, 1977-1978

Games without a win
Most consecutive Brasileirão games without a win: 20, Nacional-AM, 1981-1985

Fixtures
Most played Brasileirão fixture:

Appearances
Most career Brasileirão appearances: 458 games, Rogério Ceni
Most career Brasileirão appearances by an outfield player: 370, Zinho
Most career Brasileirão appearances at one club: 458 games, Rogério Ceni (São Paulo)
Most career top flight Brasileirão appearances at one club: 458 games, Rogério Ceni (São Paulo)
Most career Brasileirão appearances for consecutive games:
Oldest player:
Youngest player:16 years and 145 days, Toninho Cerezo

Goals

Individual
Most career Brasileirão goals: 190, Roberto Dinamite
Most career top-flight goals:190, Roberto Dinamite
Most goals in a season: 34, Washington (2004)
Most goals in a game: 6, Edmundo (for Vasco da Gama v. União São João, 11 September 1997)
Most goals in a top-flight game: 6, Edmundo (for Vasco da Gama v. União São João, 11 September 1997)
Fastest goal: 8 seconds, Nivaldo (for Náutico v. Atlético Mineiro, 1989)
Fastest goal on a Brasileirão debut:
Fastest hat-trick (time between first and third goals):
Fastest goal by a substitute:
Most own goals in one season:
Most hat-tricks in one season:
Most career hat-tricks:11, Roberto Dinamite
Longest goalkeeping run without conceding a goal:
Youngest goalscorer: 16 years and 157 days, Jo Alves

Team
Most Brasileirão goals scored in a season (after 2003): 103, Santos (2004)
Most Brasileirão goals scored in a season (before 2003): 69, Vasco da Gama (1997)
Fewest Brasileirão goals scored in a season (before 2003): 2 goals, joint record
Colatina (1979)
Guará (1979)
Americano (1980)
Itabaiana (1982)
Atlético-PR (1982)
Galícia (1983)
Ferroviário (1984)
Fewest Brasileirão goals scored in a season (after 2003): 22 goals
Náutico (2013)
Most Brasileirão goals conceded in a season (before 2003): 51, joint record
Santa Cruz (2000)
Botafogo (2001)
Atlético Mineiro (2002)
Most Brasileirão goals conceded in a season (after 2003): 92, joint record
Bahia (2003)
Paysandu (2005)
Fewest Brasileirão goals conceded in a season (before 2003): 3, joint record
Guarani (1979)
Botafogo-SP (1983)
Uberlândia (1984)
Fewest Brasileirão goals conceded in a season (after 2003): 19, São Paulo (2007)

Attendances
Record attendance: 155,523; Flamengo 3 x 0 Santos (Maracanã, 29 May 1983)

Scorelines
Record win: Corinthians 10–1 Tiradentes-PI (9 February 1983)
Record away win: Bahia 0–7 Cruzeiro (14 December 2003) and Botafogo-BA 0–7 Americano (15 March 1980)
Record away win in top division: Bahia 0–7 Cruzeiro (14 December 2003)
Most goals in a game: 12, Ceará 7–5 Ríver (1962)

Disciplinary
Most red cards in a single match: 14 (Goiás 3-1 Cruzeiro, October 4, 1979)
Fastest red card: 12 seconds, Zé Carlos

Promotion and change in position
Lowest finish by the previous season's champions:
Coritiba: 44th out of 48 clubs, 1986.
Highest finish by a promoted club: 
São Caetano: Runners-up, 2001

Copa do Brasil

Team
Most wins: 6, Cruzeiro (1993, 1996, 2000, 2003, 2017, 2018)
Most consecutive wins: 2, Cruzeiro (2017, 2018)
Most appearances: 33 seasons, Atlético Mineiro and Vitória
Most appearances without winning: 33 seasons, Vitória
Biggest win: Atlético Mineiro 11–0 Caiçara (28 February 1991)
Most goals in a final: 8 goals, 2001 (Grêmio v Corinthians)
Most goals by a winning side: 6 goals, Atlético Mineiro (2021)
Most goals by a losing side: 3 goals, joint record; Corinthians (2001, 2008) and Coritiba (2011)
Most defeats in a final: 4, Grêmio, Flamengo

Most successful clubs overall (by total of honors) 

The figures in gold represent the current holders of the competition (were competition is still active).

Managers
Most titles wins: 9, Telê Santana
Most Brasileirão title wins: 5, joint record; Lula, Vanderlei Luxemburgo
Most Copa do Brasil wins: 3, Luiz Felipe Scolari
Most Intercontinental Cup / FIFA Club World Cup wins: 2, joint record; Lula, Telê Santana
Most Copa Libertadores wins:  2, joint record; Lula, Telê Santana, Luiz Felipe Scolari, Paulo Autuori
Most Recopa Sudamericana de Campeones Intercontinentales / Supercopa Sudamericana wins: 1, Antônio Fernandes
Most Copa CONMEBOL / Copa Mercosur / Copa Sudamericana wins: 2, Émerson Leão

Footnotes

Football records and statistics in Brazil
Brazil
Records